The Andersson Cabinet (Swedish: Regeringen Andersson) was the Government of Sweden following the resignation of Prime Minister Stefan Löfven and the hasty election of Magdalena Andersson as his successor. It was expected to be a coalition government consisting of two parties: the Swedish Social Democratic Party and the Green Party. In a late turn of events after the confirmation vote, the Green Party left the government cooperation due to the government's budget proposal failing in the Riksdag. The cabinet were originally planned to be installed on 26 November 2021 during a formal government meeting with King Carl XVI Gustaf, but Andersson decided to resign due to a precedent regarding changes in a government's composition; this happened just seven hours after the vote in the Riksdag. The Speaker then set Andersson up for a new confirmation vote to make sure she still had the Riksdag's approval.

On 29 November 2021, Andersson won the vote in Riksdag and became the new prime minister of Sweden. Andersson is Sweden's first female prime minister and female head of government. She governs with a minority government by the Social Democrats. When Andersson's cabinet took office on 30 November 2021, it became the smallest Swedish government since 1979, relying on only 100 of 349 parliament members (28,65%).

On 14 September 2022, after her support coalition lost their parliamentary majority, Andersson announced that she would tender her resignation as Prime Minister on the following day.

Formation

Social Democratic-Green coalition
In the Riksdag, as long as the Speaker's proposal for a new prime minister is not opposed by half of its members, the proposal is carried.

The Riksdag initially elected Social Democratic leader Magdalena Andersson as Prime Minister on 24 November 2021, with only a slim minority voting against her (174 'no' votes out of the 349-strong Riksdag). This made her the first female prime minister in Swedish history. One member of the Riksdag from the Left Party was absent during the vote.

Departure of the Green Party 
After Andersson's budget proposal was defeated hours later on 24 November by a counter proposal from the Moderate Party, Sweden Democrats and Christian Democrats, the Green Party decided to leave the government. However, the Greens were willing to support a one-party Social Democratic minority government.

According to precedent, a new confidence vote must be held in the Riksdag whenever the composition of a government is changed. Since Andersson was elected by parliament with the promise of retaining the Social Democratic-Green coalition she had no choice but to resign only seven hours after being approved. This resignation allowed a new investiture vote to happen in parliament on 29 November when Andersson was approved again with a slim minority voting against her (173 'no' votes out of the 349-strong Riksdag). This is one 'no'-vote less than the vote on 24 November. Member of Parliament Nina Lundström from the Liberals decided to rebel against her party and thus not vote 'no' but abstain instead to Andersson becoming prime minister saying that electing her is the only way to keep the Sweden Democrats from power.

Ministers 

The following are the cabinet members:

|}
</onlyinclude>

Policy 
A specific policy manifesto were presented when Andersson held her declaration of government (regeringsförklaring) 30 November 2021.

References

2021 establishments in Sweden
Coalition governments
Politics of Sweden
Andersson, Magdalena
Andersson